Coit Tower is a  tower in the Telegraph Hill neighborhood of San Francisco, California, offering panoramic views over the city and the bay. The tower, in the city's Pioneer Park, was built between 1932 and 1933 using Lillie Hitchcock Coit's bequest to beautify the city of San Francisco. It was added to the National Register of Historic Places on January 29, 2008.

The Art Deco tower, built of unpainted reinforced concrete, was designed by architects Arthur Brown, Jr. and Henry Temple Howard. The interior features fresco murals in the American fresco mural painting style, painted by 25 different onsite artists and their numerous assistants, plus two additional paintings installed after creation offsite.

Also known as the Coit Memorial Tower, it was dedicated to the volunteer firemen who had died in San Francisco's five major fires. A concrete relief of a phoenix by sculptor Robert Boardman Howard is placed above the main entrance. It was commissioned by the architect and cast as part of the building.

Although an apocryphal story claims that the tower was designed to resemble a fire hose nozzle due to Coit's affinity with the San Francisco firefighters of the day, the resemblance is coincidental.

History

Telegraph Hill, the tower's location, has been described as "the most optimal 360 degree viewing point to the San Francisco Bay and five surrounding counties." In 1849, it became the site of a two-story observation deck, from which information about incoming ships was broadcast to city residents using an optical semaphore system, replaced in 1853 by an electrical telegraph that was destroyed by a storm in 1870.

Coit Tower was paid for with money left by Lillie Hitchcock Coit (1843–1929), a wealthy socialite who loved to chase fires in the early days of the city's history. Before December 1866, there was no city fire department, and fires in the city, which broke out regularly in the wooden buildings, were extinguished by several volunteer fire companies. Coit was one of the more eccentric characters in the history of North Beach and Telegraph Hill, smoking cigars and wearing trousers long before it was socially acceptable for women to do so. She was an avid gambler and often dressed like a man in order to gamble in the males-only establishments that dotted North Beach.

Coit's fortune funded the monument four years following her death in 1929. She had a special relationship with the city's firefighters. At the age of fifteen she witnessed the Knickerbocker Engine Co. No. 5 in response to a fire call up on Telegraph Hill when they were shorthanded; she threw her school books to the ground and pitched in to help, calling out to other bystanders to help get the engine up the hill to the fire, to get the first water onto the blaze. After that Coit became the Engine Co. mascot and could barely be constrained by her parents from jumping into action at the sound of every fire bell. She frequently rode with the Knickerbocker Engine Co. 5, especially in street parades and celebrations in which the Engine Co. participated. Through her youth and adulthood Coit was recognized as an honorary firefighter.

In her will she specified that one third of her fortune, amounting to $118,000, "be expended in an appropriate manner for the purpose of adding to the beauty of the city which I have always loved." Two memorials were built in her name. One was Coit Tower, and the other was a sculpture depicting three firemen, one of them carrying a woman in his arms.

The San Francisco County Board of Supervisors proposed that Coit's bequest be used for a road at Lake Merced. This proposal brought disapproval from the estate's executors, who expressed a desire that the county find "ways and means of expending this money on a memorial that in itself would be an entity and not a unit of public development". Art Commission president Herbert Fleishhacker suggested a memorial on Telegraph Hill, which was approved by the estate executors. An additional $7,000 in city funds was appropriated, and a design competition was initiated. The winner was architect Arthur Brown, Jr, whose design was completed and dedicated on October 8, 1933.

Coit Tower was listed as a San Francisco Designated Landmark in 1984 and on the National Register of Historic Places in 2008. Although Coit Tower itself is not technically a California Historical Landmark, the state historical plaque for Telegraph Hill is located in the tower's lobby, marking the site of the original signal station.

The San Francisco Arts Commission ordered the removal of the Statue of Christopher Columbus that had stood outside the entrance of the tower since 1957, following numerous other removals of controversial statues during the George Floyd protests that began in May 2020, and it was removed on June 18, 2020.

Architecture
Brown's competition design envisioned a restaurant in the tower, which was changed to an exhibition area in the final version. The design uses three nesting concrete cylinders, the outermost a tapering fluted  shaft that supports the viewing platform. An intermediate shaft contains a stairway, and an inner shaft houses the elevator. A rotunda at the base houses display space and a gift shop.

Potable water is pumped from a water main at street level to two  tanks on the fifth floor, and gravity is used to feed all systems in the tower; a booster pump was installed later at the tanks to provide adequate pressure for the restrooms. Because of this arrangement, the murals (on the second and ground floors) are vulnerable to water damage from system leaks, which could be avoided if adequate pressure was available from the water supply at the street.

Mural project

The Coit Tower murals in the American Social Realism style formed the pilot project of the Public Works of Art Project, the first of the New Deal federal employment programs for artists. Ralph Stackpole and Bernard Zakheim successfully sought the commission in 1933, and supervised the muralists, including Maxine Albro, Victor Arnautoff, Jane Berlandina, Ray Bertrand, Ray Boynton, Ralph Chessé, Rinaldo Cuneo, Ben F. Cunningham, Mallette "Harold" Dean, Parker Hall, Edith Hamlin, George Albert Harris, William Hesthal, John Langley Howard, Lucien Labaudt, Gordon Langdon, Jose Moya del Pino Otis Oldfield, Frederick E. Olmsted Jr., Suzanne Scheuer, Edward Terada, Frede Vidar, and Clifford Wight. Many were faculty and students of the California School of Fine Arts (CSFA).

These artists (chosen by Walter Heil, director of the de Young Museum, together with other officials) were each paid $25 to $45 per week to depict "aspects of life in California."

Themes
The artists were committed in varying degrees to racial equality and to leftist and Marxist political ideas, which are strongly expressed in the paintings. Bernard Zakheim's mural Library  depicts fellow artist John Langley Howard crumpling a newspaper in his left hand as he reaches for a shelved copy of Karl Marx's Das Kapital (here spelled as Das Capital) with his right. Workers of all races are shown as equals, often in the heroic poses of Socialist realism, while well-dressed racially white members of the capitalist classes enjoy the fruit of their labor.

Victor Arnautoff's City Life  includes the periodicals The New Masses and The Daily Worker in the scene's news stand rack.

John Langley Howard's mural California Industrial Scenes  depicts an ethnically diverse Labor March as well as showing a destitute family panning for gold while a wealthy, heavily caricatured ensemble observes.

Stackpole's Industries of California  was composed along the same lines as an early study of the destroyed Man at the Crossroads.

The youngest of the muralists, George Albert Harris, painted a mural called Banking and Law . In the mural, the world of finance is represented by the Federal Reserve Bank and a stock market ticker (in which stocks are shown as declining) and law is illustrated by a law library. Some of the book titles that appear in the law library, such as Civil, Penal, and Moral Codes, are legitimate, while others list fellow muralists as authors, in a joking or derogatory manner.

After Diego Rivera's Man at the Crossroads mural was destroyed by its Rockefeller Center patrons for the inclusion of an image of Lenin, the Coit Tower muralists protested, picketing the tower. Sympathy for Rivera led some artists to incorporate references to the Rivera incident; in Zakheim's Library panel , Stackpole is painted reading a newspaper headline announcing the destruction of Rivera's mural.

Censorship
After most of the Coit Tower murals had already been completed, the 1934 West Coast waterfront strike, taking place nearby at the foot of Telegraph Hill, caused government officials, shipping companies, some union leaders and the press to raise fears about communist agitation. This "red scare" has been identified as playing a "crucial role" in a subsequent controversy that mainly focused on two of the murals: 
  and : These portraits were linked originally by a third small fresco in which Clifford Wight portrayed capitalism, the New Deal and communism, the three prominent economic systems of the era, with the communism part containing a hammer and sickle and the caption "Workers of the World Unite." 
 : John Langley Howard's Industry mural (designed with the support of his architect brother Henry Howard), which depicts California industrial scenes including out-of-work men, and angered conservatives by showing a banner of the communist periodical Western Worker above a crowd of workers.

On June 23, 1934, the conservative banker Herbert Fleishhacker, the most powerful member of the committee allocating funds from the Public Works of Art Project, asked Heil to inspect the art, who telegraphed back that some artists had included "details ... and certain symbols which might be interpreted as communistic propaganda," and that "editors of influential papers ... have warned us that they would take hostile attitude towards whole project unless those details be removed." The official opening of the tower, planned for July 7, was canceled and Fleishhacker ordered to close the tower and to block the view from outside through the windows. Subsequently, articles in the San Francisco Chronicle and The San Francisco Examiner attacked the project, sometimes using misleading representations of the artworks in question, while Wight refused to remove the hammer and sickle symbol from his mural. However, federal government officials decided that the offending parts would need to be painted over, and 16 of the artists signed a statement saying that they opposed the hammer and sickle symbol and that it "has no place in the subject matter assigned." Eventually, only the hammer and sickle and the "Western Worker" banner were removed, and Coit Tower opened on October 12, 1934.

Technical details and access
Two of the murals are of San Francisco Bay scenes. Most murals are done in fresco; the exceptions are one mural done in egg tempera (Home Life by Jane Berlandina, : upstairs, in the last decorated room) and the works done in the elevator foyer, which are oil on canvas (and ). While most of the murals were restored in 1990 and again in 2014 through cleaning and touching up scratches, the murals in the spiral stairway exit to the observation platform (Powell Street by Lucien Labaudt) were not restored but durably painted over with epoxy surfacing.

Most of the murals are open for public viewing without charge during open hours, although there are ongoing negotiations by the Recreation and Parks Department of San Francisco to begin charging visitors a fee to enter the mural rotunda. The murals in the spiral stairway and second floor, normally closed to the public, are open for viewing through tours. Labaudt's Powell Street runs along both sides of the spiral staircase; the second-floor murals all carry recreational themes.

Since 2004 artist Ben Wood collaborated with other artists on large scale video projections onto the exterior of Coit Tower, in 2004, 2006, 2008 & 2009.

Panorama

The tower, which stands atop Telegraph Hill in San Francisco's Pioneer Park, offers panoramic views of San Francisco that take in "crooked" Lombard Street, Nob Hill, Russian Hill, Twin Peaks, Aquatic Park, Pier 39, the Financial District and the Ferry Building, as well as San Francisco Bay itself including Angel Island, Alcatraz, Treasure Island, and the Golden Gate and Bay Bridges.

Gallery

In popular culture 

Coit Tower is a prominent landscape feature in Alfred Hitchcock's 1958 film, Vertigo, set largely in San Francisco. The character of Madeleine (Kim Novak) tells Scotty (James Stewart) that she has used the tower to orient herself to his apartment, as she did not know his street address; he responds this is the first time he had been grateful for the tower. Art director Henry Bumstead, who worked on Vertigo, noted that Hitchcock was adamant that Coit Tower should be seen in the film from the apartment of the lead character, portrayed by Stewart. When Bumstead asked why, Hitchcock said, "It's a phallic symbol."

Coit Tower is also featured in:
 The Enforcer (1976)
 Tex Murphy series (1989-2014)
 California's Gold Episode 12004
 PBS The History Detectives Episode 709 August 24 2009.

See also 

 49-Mile Scenic Drive
 History of San Francisco
 List of San Francisco Designated Landmarks

References

External links

 Official website
 http://www.protectcoittower.org/
 

Art Deco architecture in California
Art Deco sculptures and memorials
Buildings and structures in San Francisco
Observation towers on the National Register of Historic Places
Towers in California
Towers completed in 1933
Monuments and memorials on the National Register of Historic Places in California
National Register of Historic Places in San Francisco
1930s architecture in the United States
Public Works of Art Project
San Francisco Designated Landmarks
Landmarks in San Francisco
North Beach, San Francisco